This article lists players who have captained the Cork minor hurling team in the Munster Minor Hurling Championship and the All-Ireland Minor Hurling Championship.

List of captains

See also
List of Cork senior hurling team captains

References

 
Hurling
Cork